Weijia Jiang (born June 6, 1983) is an American television journalist and reporter. She is based in Washington, D.C. and has served as the Senior White House Correspondent for CBS News since July 2018. Jiang's question to President Donald Trump about the COVID-19 testing program in the United States during a White House press briefing received global attention and coverage.

Early life
Born in Xiamen, Mainland China to parents Liya Wei and Huade "John" Jiang, Jiang was two when the family immigrated to the United States. She was raised in Buckhannon, West Virginia where her parents, who are now retired, owned and operated Chinatown Restaurant. At age 13, Jiang became interested in journalism after encouragement from her eighth-grade teacher, Dianne Williams. Together, they prepared a home-made TV show to submit to a competition run by the national student broadcast Channel One, leading to an opportunity for Jiang to intern as a student anchor and reporter in Los Angeles for two weeks. During high school, Jiang worked on the high school video news staff under the mentorship of her teacher Julia Conley.

In 2005, Jiang graduated from the College of William & Mary with a bachelor's degree in Philosophy and a minor in Chemistry. She worked on the student-run television station WMTV, and credits the university for developing her curiosity. She earned a Master's in broadcast journalism from Syracuse University, graduating in 2006. She was also recognized for her contributions in the field of communications as an inductee of Newhouse School of Public Communication's Professional Gallery in 2012.

Career

After completing her degree in broadcast journalism and from 2006 to 2008, Jiang was a reporter for WBOC-TV in  Salisbury, Maryland. From 2008 until 2012, she worked at WJZ-TV, Baltimore. From 2012 to 2015, Jiang worked on WCBS-TV, New York City as a general assignment reporter and fill-in anchor where she covered major stories such as the Boston Marathon bombings, the Sandy Hook Elementary School shootings, and the Hurricane Sandy.

In 2013, WBZ-TV, Boston, won a regional Emmy award in the 34th News & Documentary Emmy Awards for the spot news coverage of the Newtown Tragedy which Jiang was involved in reporting. In 2014 Jiang was the Gala Dinner MC for the Outstanding 50 Asian Americans in Business Gala Dinner which also featured letters of support from then-president Barack Obama, Andrew Cuomo and Bill de Blasio.

In 2015, Jiang moved to Washington, D.C. to become a correspondent for Newspath, the 24-hour news gathering service for CBS News. As part of her role she has covered major political stories such as the 2016 United States presidential elections, the funeral of the First Lady of the United States Barbara Bush, and the congressional baseball shooting, also extensively reporting on both the Obama and Trump administrations. In 2018, Jiang became CBS News correspondent for the White House, following her coverage of President Donald Trump's G-7 Summit and the Trump administration's 'zero tolerance' policy. Jiang traveled with President Trump on many occasions, including on-board Air Force One, and has covered stories including Trump and Russian President Vladimir Putin's historic summit in Helsinki, the Mueller Probe, the 2020 United States Presidential elections, and president Trump's first and second impeachments.

Jiang is a member of the Asian American Journalists Association. She continues to cover the White House as a senior White House Correspondent for CBS News during the Biden Administration.

Confrontations with President Trump
As a White House Correspondent during the Trump administration, Jiang had several high-profile clashes with then-President Trump. Trump often reacted sensitively to her line of questioning, in one instance abruptly ending a press conference when she pushed back on his refusal to answer a question. Trump's interactions with her were widely criticized as racist and emblematic of his hostility to the press.

Memoir
Jiang is authoring her memoir titled "Other", set to be published by One Signal Publishers, an imprint of Simon & Schuster. She will explore her personal trajectory from her childhood in West Virginia, to being part of newsrooms lacking representation, and her role as the only Chinese-American reporter to regularly correspond with the White House. Through her narrative, she hopes to capture her lived experiences of difference and diversity in growing up as an Asian-American woman and a Chinese-American reporter living and working in the United States. Explaining the title, Jiang contextualises "Other" as the violence of discrimination and hate from a lack of knowledge and intolerance towards difference, also expressing her deep concerns about AAPI hate and its negative impact on AAPI communities.

Awards
 RTDNA Edward R. Murrow Award, Feature Reporting, "Gone But Not Forgotten", WBOC-TV, Salisbury, MD
 Chesapeake Associated Press Broadcasters' Association Contest Awards, Outstanding Feature/Human Interest, "Gone But Not Forgotten (Hooper's Island)", (co-winner with Tim Jones)

Personal life
On March 17, 2018, Jiang married Travis Luther Lowe, an executive at Yelp and a donor to Democratic Party candidates and causes, in Palm Springs, California. Civil rights activist Jim Obergefell led the ceremony, which also featured a Chinese tea ceremony. Jiang and Lowe had met in college, where they co-hosted a weekly campus television show. In January 2019, she gave birth to their daughter.

See also 
 Anti-Chinese sentiment in the United States
 Asian American Journalists Association

References

External links

 
 Weijia Jiang page at CBS News

1983 births
Living people
21st-century American journalists
21st-century American non-fiction writers
21st-century American women writers
American memoirists
American television reporters and correspondents
American women journalists
Anti-Chinese sentiment in the United States
CBS News people
Chinese emigrants to the United States
College of William & Mary alumni
Journalists from West Virginia
People from Buckhannon, West Virginia
People from Xiamen
Trump administration controversies
Writers from Fujian